Sydney Homer (14 January 1903 — 22 January 1983) was an English footballer who played as an outside right. He made over 240 Football League appearances in the years before the Second World War.

Career
Syd Homer played for Bristol City.

Honours
with Bristol City
Welsh Cup winners 1934

with Bloxwich Strollers
Birmingham Combination winner: 1924–25

References

1903 births
1983 deaths
People from Bloxwich
English footballers
Association football wingers
English Football League players
Southern Football League players
Bristol Rovers F.C. players
Wolverhampton Wanderers F.C. players
Bristol City F.C. players
Worcester City F.C. players